Konev ( and Bulgarian,  from конь or кон meaning horse) is a Russian, Bulgarian or Ukrainian masculine surname, its feminine counterpart is Koneva. It may refer to:
Anatoly Konev (1921–1965), Russian basketball player 
Andrei Konev (born 1989), Russian ice hockey defenceman
Ekaterina Koneva (born 1988), Russian triple jumper
Ivan Konev (1897–1973), Soviet military commander
Ivan Nikitich Konev (1899–1983), Soviet Major General 
Natalya Koneva
Vladimir Konev

Russian-language surnames
Bulgarian-language surnames